Dracula chimaera is the type species of the orchid genus Dracula.

References

External links 
 
 

chimaera